Grace Clements (born 2 May 1984) is an English track and field athlete. She was born in Dartford, Kent and educated at Dartford Grammar School for Girls. She won a bronze medal for England at the 2010 Commonwealth Games in India, competing in the heptathlon.

See also
England at the 2010 Commonwealth Games

References

External links
 
 Profile at The Power of Ten

Living people
1984 births
Sportspeople from Dartford
English heptathletes
British heptathletes
British female athletes
Commonwealth Games bronze medallists for England
Commonwealth Games medallists in athletics
Athletes (track and field) at the 2010 Commonwealth Games
Athletes (track and field) at the 2014 Commonwealth Games
English female athletes
Medallists at the 2010 Commonwealth Games